Oğuz Sarvan (born 18 April 1955) is a former Turkish professional football referee. He officiated the second leg of the 1999 Turkish Cup Final between Beşiktaş and Galatasaray. He was also a FIFA referee from 1991 to 2000. His last fixture in a European competition was the second tie between Werder Bremen and Bordeaux on 7 December 2000, in the 2000–01 UEFA Cup third phase, before retiring in January 2001. Outside football, he works as a dentist. His father, Muzaffer Sarvan was also a match official.

References

External links
Oğuz Sarvan at Turkish Football Federation

1955 births
Living people
Sportspeople from İzmir
Turkish football referees
UEFA Champions League referees
UEFA Europa League referees